The Rural Municipality of Last Mountain Valley No. 250 is a rural municipality (RM) in the Canadian province of Saskatchewan within Census Division No. 11 and  Division No. 5.

History 
The RM of Last Mountain Valley No. 250 incorporated as a rural municipality on December 13, 1909.

Arlington Beach House

Arlington Beach House was one of the first hotels built in Saskatchewan and was one of the first buildings constructed along Last Mountain Lake. This once luxury hotel was built in 1910 at Arlington Beach, Saskatchewan by the William Pearson Land Company as their centre of operations in Saskatchewan. It was a popular vacation destination for people all across central Saskatchewan.

Geography

Communities and localities 
The following urban municipalities are surrounded by the RM.

Towns
 Govan

Villages
 Duval

The following unincorporated communities are within the RM.

Organized hamlets
 Arlington Beach

Localities
 Cymric

Last Mountain
Last Mountain is a hilly plateau   mostly within the south-east corner of the RM of Last Mountain Valley. A portion of the southern slope is in the RM of McKillop and a portion of the eastern slope is in the RM of Longlaketon. Duval is the closest community, directly to the west, and Strasbourg, to the south-west, is the closest town.

The Legend of Last Mountain is a Plains Indians legend on the creation of Last Mountain. It states that after the Great Chief finished building all the hills on the prairies there was left-over dirt, which he used to create Last Mountain. That was the last thing he built and the neighbouring lake, Last Mountain Lake, was the last lake to be filled.

That legend was first published by William Pearson Publishing Company Ltd. Of Winnipeg c. 1911. It was an exert from a pamphlet called “Last Mountain Lake Saskatchewan’s Summer Resort”.

Last Mountain Regional Park
Last Mountain Regional Park (51°21′5″N, 105°13′2″W)  is a regional park at the far north-west corner of the RM within the Last Mountain Lake Bird Sanctuary, along the eastern shore of Last Mountain Lake. Founded in 1963, it is one of Saskatchewan's oldest regional parks. It is located about 15 km west of Govan, off Highway 20.

The park features access to the bird sanctuary and Last Mountain Lake National Wildlife Area, which are a Ramsar site. Saskatchewan's only bird observatory, Last Mountain Bird Observatory, is located in the park.

There is also beach access to the lake for swimming, fishing, and water sports.

The park offers seasonal and daily camping, as well as private cabins, an outdoor pool, aquatic programme, shower house, laundry, nine-hole sand green golf course, sand volleyball court, and a concession.

Demographics 

Government 
The RM of Last Mountain Valley No. 250 is governed by an elected municipal council and an appointed administrator that meets on the second Thursday of every month. The reeve of the RM is Allan Magel while its administrator is Kelly Holbrook. The RM's office is located in Govan.

Transportation 
 Saskatchewan Highway 20
 Canadian Pacific Railway

See also
List of rural municipalities in Saskatchewan

References 

Last Mountain Valley

Hills of Saskatchewan
Division No. 11, Saskatchewan